NeoPhotonics Corporation is an American public corporation based in San Jose, California. It was founded in 1996. The company develops, manufactures and sells optoelectronic products that transmit, receive and switch high speed digital optical signals for communications networks, These products include transceivers, tunable lasers, high bandwidth receivers, optical semiconductors, photonic integrated circuits, and 100 gigabit per second and above modules." These are each "cost-effective components that handle massive amounts of data at very high speeds".

NeoPhotonics products primarily implement coherent technology and include those designed for 100G and beyond data rates, such as at 200G, 400G and 600G, for telecom and datacenter or content provider networks and applications.  The company's high speed 100G and beyond coherent products are based on Advanced Hybrid Photonic Integration technology.

Applications in coherent transmission use not only amplitude but also phase and polarization to increase data rates tenfold or more over conventional “on-off” transmission protocols.  Coherent transmission is also necessary for next-generation flexible and efficient switching of signals individual wavelength without conflict or contention between wavelengths in an optical network, such as Software Defined Networks.  Coherent transmission has become the technology of choice for the most advanced high speed telecommunications networks today.

Revenues from the company's high speed products have grown rapidly due to the rapid expansion of telecom backbone and content provider networks accommodating increased mobile traffic. Initial adoption of the company's 100G coherent products were in the Long Haul market sector, over the next several years it is expect that growth in 100G and beyond will be mainly driven by adoption of 100G coherent products in the much larger Metro market sector and the datacenter market for large web-scale data network market.

NeoPhotonics Corporation is listed on the New York Stock Exchange under the ticker symbol NPTN.

History
The company was co-founded by Chinese-born Sean Bi and Japanese-born Nobuyuki Kambe in 1996. The two men were introduced by one of Bi's professors at the Massachusetts Institute of Technology (MIT). Meanwhile, the company received an initial investment of US$1 million from Pete Thomas at Institutional Venture Partners. The company was initially called NanoGram Corporation, and pursued development of technologies and applications using inorganic nanomaterials.  The company changed its name to NeoPhotonics Corporation in 2002.

At that time, and according to Forbes, in 2002, in the midst of the tech bubble, the company was reorganized into three companies: NanoGram Devices, which kept the battery-making technology for medical devices; NeoPhotonics, which went after the optical devices market; and a third firm, NanoGram Corp., which initially managed the intellectual property and then further developed optical and polymer films using nanomaterials. It also received US$35 million from investors in 2002.  In early 2003 the company acquired Lightwave Microsystems, a manufacturer of silica-on-silica passive integrated optical products. Late that year, again in 2003, the company filed for reorganization under bankruptcy. Shortly thereafter, after completing their reorganization and exiting bankruptcy, the company sold NanoGram Devices for approximately US$45 million to Greatbatch Technologies.

In 2005, the company acquired ownership in Photon Technology Co., Ltd., a Chinese manufacturer of optoelectric devices and modules, based in Shenzhen, China. By 2006 they acquired most all of Photon's outstanding shares.  In the following years, NeoPhotonics further acquired optical component companies Optun, Inc., Lightconnect, Inc., BeamExpress, Inc., Santur, Inc., LAPIS Semiconductor Co., previously known as  OKI Semiconductor Co. (optical unit), and Paxera Corp. It also purchased the tunable laser and transceiver product lines of EMCORE.

The company completed is initial public offering (IPO) on the New York Stock Exchange on February 2, 2011. As of October 2016, the market capitalization of NeoPhotonics Corporation was approximately $700 million.

As of June 2016, the company owned approximately 550 US patents and 100 patents overseas. The company operates manufacturing in Silicon Valley, California; Tokyo, Japan; and Shenzhen, China.

In August 2022, NeoPhotonics was acquired by Lumentum for $918 million.

References

External links
 

Electronics companies of the United States
Technology companies based in the San Francisco Bay Area
Manufacturing companies based in San Jose, California
Electronics companies established in 1987
1987 establishments in California
Companies formerly listed on the New York Stock Exchange
Companies that filed for Chapter 11 bankruptcy in 2003
2022 mergers and acquisitions